Per Hedenberg (born 17 May 1936) is a Swedish rower. He competed in the men's eight event at the 1960 Summer Olympics.

References

External links
 

1936 births
Living people
Swedish male rowers
Olympic rowers of Sweden
Rowers at the 1960 Summer Olympics
Sportspeople from Västra Götaland County